Atago Station the name of two train stations in Japan:

Atago Station (Miyagi) (愛宕駅), Miyagi Prefecture
Atago Station (Chiba) (愛宕駅), Chiba Prefecture